Partner is a 1968 Italian drama film by Bernardo Bertolucci.

Based on the 1846 novella The Double by Fyodor Dostoyevsky, it entered the 29th Venice Film Festival and the Quinzaine des Réalisateurs section at the 22nd Cannes Film Festival.

Plot    
This film follows a college student who has a routine life and who encounters a twin he is not related to. Along the way, he discovers that the twin friend has many qualities he doesn't have.

Cast 
Pierre Clémenti as Giacobbe I and II 
Stefania Sandrelli as Clara
Tina Aumont as the seller of detergent
Sergio Tofano as Petrushka 
Ninetto Davoli as the student

References

External links

1968 films
Italian drama films
Films directed by Bernardo Bertolucci
Films based on Russian novels
Films based on works by Fyodor Dostoyevsky
Films scored by Ennio Morricone
1960s Italian-language films
1960s Italian films